Sakhi is a Kannada fortnightly women's interest magazine, circulated in Karnataka, India, which has its headquarters in Chennai, Tamil Nadu, India. It was started as a monthly by Dainik Jagran Group in March 2001.

Sister publications
 The New Indian Express, an Indian English-language broadsheet daily newspaper
 Kannada Prabha, a daily Kannada language newspaper

See also
 List of Kannada-language magazines
 Media in Karnataka

References

External links

Film magazines published in India
Kannada-language magazines
Magazines established in 2001
Mass media in Bangalore
Monthly magazines published in India
Women's magazines published in India
Biweekly magazines published in India